Jimmy Henderson (May 20, 1921 – June 10, 1998) was an American jazz trombonist and bandleader.

Early life and education 
Henderson was born in Wichita Falls, Texas. He began playing piano at age six and picked up trombone a few years later. By age 13, he had joined a musicians' union and was first chair at the Wichita Falls Symphony Orchestra. He won several trombone competitions by age fourteen and started his own orchestra while still in his teens, in addition to studying at the Cincinnati Conservatory of Music.

Career 
Henderson toured with the big bands of Hal McIntyre, Jimmy Dorsey, and Tommy Dorsey. In 1954, he moved to Los Angeles, where he did copious work as a session musician for some 20 years. Among his credits in the studios was the soundtrack for Bonanza. From 1957 to 1960, he was also a member of Lawrence Welk's orchestra in which he appeared weekly on the Maestro's television show. He led his own orchestra for fifteen years, and was the musical director for the Emmy Awards, Television Academy Honors, and Directors Guild of America Awards. In the 1970s, he led the Glenn Miller Orchestra ghost band before retiring in 1980.

Discography

As sideman
 Elmer Bernstein, Music from the Soundtrack of the Man with the Golden Arm (Decca, 1956)
 Frank Capp, Percussion in a Tribute to Lawrence Welk (Kimberly, 1963)
 Mel Henke, La Dolce Henke (Warner Bros., 1962)
 B.B. King, Compositions of Duke Ellington and Others (Eros, 1961)
 Glenn Miller, The Direct Disc Sound of the Glenn Miller Orchestra (Great American Gramophone, 1977)
 Zulema, Ms. Z. (Sussex, 1973)

References

1921 births
1998 deaths
American jazz trombonists
Male trombonists
American jazz bandleaders
20th-century American musicians
20th-century trombonists
20th-century American male musicians
American male jazz musicians